Fathers and Sons is the seventh studio album by the American blues musician Muddy Waters, released as a double LP by Chess Records in August 1969.

The album contains both studio and live recordings recorded in April 1969 in Chicago, Illinois, with an all-star band, including Michael Bloomfield and Paul Butterfield of the Paul Butterfield Blues Band, Donald "Duck" Dunn of Booker T. & the M.G.'s, Otis Spann, and Sam Lay.

The album was Waters's biggest mainstream success, reaching #70 on the Billboard 200, which was his only appearance in the top half of the chart. Waters would not make another appearance on the 200 until Hard Again in 1977.

Background 
According to Marshall Chess, Fathers and Sons came about when Mike Bloomfield said that he and Paul Butterfield wanted to do an album with Muddy Waters while in Chicago for a charity concert. Chess rounded up Donald "Duck" Dunn, Otis Spann, and Sam Lay for the studio sessions.

While some blues purists criticized Waters's "psychedelic" album Electric Mud, Fathers and Sons was received more favorably since it avoided psychedelia, instead showcasing his "classic" sound of the 1950s. In many ways, the album anticipated his later, critically acclaimed, albums produced by Johnny Winter.

Recording and production 
The studio disc of the album was recorded on April 21–23, 1969, at Ter Mar Studios. These sides were engineered by Ron Malo and featured rhythm guitarist Paul Asbell, who did not play on the live songs.

The live songs were recorded on April 24, 1969, at the Super Cosmic Joy-Scout Jamboree. These sides were engineered by Reice Hamel. Drummer Buddy Miles played on the second part of "Got My Mojo Working".

The producer on all sessions was Norman Dayron, who would go on to produce The London Howlin' Wolf Sessions in 1970, among other items.

Artwork and design 
The cover illustration for Fathers and Sons was created by Don Wilson and was based on Michelangelo's design on the Sistine Chapel. The original album's design was by Daily Planet and was packaged in a foldout sleeve. The 2001 MCA Records expanded reissue featured a reissued design by Mike Fink.

Track listing 
All songs written by McKinley Morganfield, except where indicated.

Vinyl version 
Side A (studio)
"All Aboard" – 2:50
"Mean Disposition" – 5:42
"Blow Wind Blow" – 3:35
"Can't Lose What You Ain't Never Had" – 3:03
"Walkin' Thru The Park" – 3:07

Side B  (studio)
"Forty Days and Forty Nights" (Bernard Roth) – 3:04
"Standin' Round Crying" – 4:01
"I'm Ready" (Willie Dixon) – 3:33
"Twenty Four Hours" (Eddie Boyd) – 4:46
"Sugar Sweet" (Mel London) – 2:16

Side C (live)
"Long Distance Call" – 6:35
"Baby, Please Don't Go" (Big Joe Williams) – 3:05
"Honey Bee" – 3:57

Side D (live)
"The Same Thing" (Dixon) – 6:00
"Got My Mojo Working, Part 1" (Preston Foster, Morganfield) – 3:39
"Got My Mojo Working, Part 2" (Foster, Morganfield) – 5:33

CD version 
"All Aboard" – 2:52
"Mean Disposition" – 5:42
"Blow Wind Blow" – 3:38
"Can't Lose What You Ain't Never Had" – 3:06
"Walkin' Thru The Park" – 3:21
"Forty Days And Forty Nights" (Roth) – 3:08
"Standin' Round Cryin'" – 4:05
"I'm Ready" (Dixon) – 3:39
"Twenty Four Hours" (Boyd) – 4:48
"Sugar Sweet" – 2:18
"Country Boy"* – 3:20
"I Love the Life I Live (I Live the Life I Love)"* (Dixon) – 2:45
"Oh Yeah"* (Dixon) – 3:38
"I Feel So Good"* (Big Bill Broonzy) – 3:00
"Long Distance Call"+ – 6:37
"Baby, Please Don't Go"+ (Williams) – 3:03
"Honey Bee"+ – 3:56
"The Same Thing"+ (Dixon) – 5:59
"Got My Mojo Working, Part 1"+ (Foster, Morganfield) – 3:22
"Got My Mojo Working, Part 2"+ (Foster, Morganfield) – 2:54

 * = Bonus track
 + = Recorded live

Personnel
Muddy Waters – vocals, guitar
Otis Spann – piano
Michael Bloomfield – guitar
Paul Butterfield – harmonica
Donald Dunn – bass guitar
Sam Lay – drums
Paul Asbell – rhythm guitar
Buddy Miles – drums on "Got My Mojo Working, Part 2"
Jeff Carp – chromatic harmonica on "All Aboard"
Phil Upchurch – bass guitar on "All Aboard"
Technical
Norman Dayron – producer
Ron Malo – engineer
Reice Hamel – engineer in Live Sessions

Release history

References

External links 

Fathers and Sons. Expanded Reissue at Yahoo! Music

Muddy Waters albums
1969 albums
1969 live albums
Chess Records albums
Chess Records live albums
MCA Records albums
MCA Records live albums